Calponia is a monotypic genus of araneomorph spiders in the family Caponiidae, containing the single species, Calponia harrisonfordi. It was first described in 1993 by Norman I. Platnick, who named the type species after the film actor Harrison Ford to thank him for narrating a documentary for the Natural History Museum in London. It has only been found in California in the United States.

Description
Unlike its more modern relatives, it has few of the family's characteristic distal leg segment modifications and retains all eight eyes. Much of its physiology is not well understood, but it is thought to eat other spiders.

See also
Pheidole harrisonfordi
List of organisms named after famous people (born 1900–1949)

References

Caponiidae
Endemic fauna of California
Spiders of the United States
Monotypic Araneomorphae genera
Taxa named by Norman I. Platnick